The International Crisis Group (ICG; also known as the Crisis Group) is a transnational non-profit, non-governmental organisation founded in 1995. It is a think tank, used by policymakers and academics, performing research and analysis on global crises. ICG has described itself as "working to prevent wars and shape policies that will build a more peaceful world". 

The International Crisis Group (ICG) states that it provides early warning through its monthly CrisisWatch bulletin, a global conflict tracker which is designed to identify both risks of escalation and opportunities to advance peace. The organisation says that it produces detailed analysis and advice on specific policy issues that are affecting conflict or potential conflict situations; that it engages with policy-makers, regional organisations and other key actors to promote peaceful solutions to major conflicts; and that it offers new strategic and tactical thinking on intractable conflicts and crises.

They differentiate themselves from other Western think tanks, noting their permanent field presence, which forms the basis of the organisation's methodology. It has regional programmers covering Africa, Asia, Europe and Central Asia, Latin America and the Caribbean, the Middle East and North Africa, and the United States. , ICG had 110 staff members.

The Crisis Group, and in particular its Iran Project Director, Ali Vaez, played an important role in advancing the Joint Comprehensive Plan of Action (JCPOA).

Funding 
Investor and philanthropist George Soros provided the organisation's seed funding and continues to support it. The first government representative to offer financial support was Finnish President Martti Ahtisaari, in March 1994. That same year, Gareth Evans, as Foreign Minister of Australia, pledged $500,000..

A January 1995 meeting in London brought many international figures together and approved a proposal for an annual budget of $8 million and 75 full-time staff. In mid-1995, the organisation was formally registered in the U.S. as a tax-exempt non-profit. From 1996 to 1999, Crisis Group had an annual budget of around $2 million and around 20 full-time staff; by 2017 its budget had risen to over $17 million. Crisis Group received funding under grants from governments, charitable foundations, private companies and individual donors. For the financial year ending June 30, 2019, it received 43% of its funding from governments, 31% from foundations, 22% from the private sector, 2% from in-kind contributions and 2% from investment income.

In a 2014 paper for Third World Quarterly, social researcher Berit Bliesemann de Guevara writes that ICG's significant budget was a requirement of its activities, though small compared to government research agencies. She notes that "Critics have argued that it is not the amount but the sources of the ICG's funding which have opened Western policymakers' doors to its advocacy, while at the same time (possibly) compromising the ICG's political independence". She notes that the ICG has "contradict[ed] the idea of simple, straightforward connections between donors and reporting" through the broad variety of its donors.

Organisation

Offices 
Crisis Group is headquartered in Brussels, with advocacy offices in Washington DC, New York and London. Other legally registered offices are based in Bogota, Colombia; Dakar, Senegal; Istanbul, Turkey; and Nairobi, Kenya.

As of June 2018, Crisis Group has a presence in Abu Dhabi, Abuja, Bangkok, Beirut, Caracas, Gaza City, Guatemala City, Hong Kong, Jerusalem, Johannesburg, Juba, Kabul, Kiev, Mexico City, Mogadishu, Rabat, Tbilisi, Toronto, Tunis and Yangon.

Board of trustees 
Robert Malley, who previously served in the Obama administration as a senior adviser, became president and CEO of ICG in January 2018. His predecessors in the position include former UN Under-Secretary-General for Peacekeeping Operations Jean-Marie Guéhenno, former UN High Commissioner for Human Rights and Justice of the Supreme Court of Canada Louise Arbour, and former Foreign Minister of Australia Gareth Evans. Malley had his ties to the Obama electoral campaign severed in May 2008, when it became public that Malley had been in discussions with the militant Palestinian group Hamas, listed by the U.S. State Department as a terrorist organisation.

The board of trustees is chaired by Mark Malloch Brown, former UN Deputy Secretary-General and Administrator of the United Nations Development Programme. The Vice-Chair of the Board is Ayo Obe, lawyer, columnist and TV presenter from Nigeria.

Past board members have included Sandy Berger and Stephen Solarz. Chairmen emeritus are Martti Ahtisaari and Gareth Evans.

Awards 
Crisis Group's "In Pursuit of Peace Award” was established in 2005, and is associated with a gala event in New York City. Recipients include U.S. Presidents Bill Clinton and George H.W. Bush, Hillary Clinton, former Brazilian President Lula da Silva, Nobel Peace Prize laureates Martti Ahtisaari and Ellen Johnson Sirleaf, and financier and philanthropist George Soros.

Recipients for 2018 included Frank Giustra, founder of the Radcliffe Foundation and a prolific entrepreneur and financier, and H.R.H. Prince Zeid Raad Al Hussein, UN High Commissioner for Human Rights and the Olympic Refugee and Paralympic Teams.

Research and critique about the organization 
In 2010, Tom Hazeldine argued in an article published in the New Left Review that the ICG "styles itself as independent and non-partisan, but has consistently championed NATO's wars to fulsome transatlantic praise". A 2007 piece in Foreign Policy described ICG as "liberal" and critical of Venezuelan president Hugo Chávez.

The ICG generated controversy in April 2013 as it awarded Myanmar President Thein Sein its "In Pursuit of Peace Award", with the award ceremony coinciding with the publication of a Human Rights Watch report of ethnic cleansing by Sein's administration.

In 2014, the journal Third World Quarterly published a special issue about the ICG and its role in knowledge production about conflict, featuring 10 separate critiques about the ICG, ranging from its influence on foreign-policy makers, "manufacturing" crises, and the methodologies it deploys in gathering its research. The ICG's briefings and reports were described as having "a generally good reputation" among policymakers in the issue's introduction, which also notes that while academics working on conflict often cite the ICG's analysis, there is little academic research about the ICG itself.

Notes

Citations

General sources

External links
 Official website
 International Crisis Group: The Problem Solvers in Asia's Heroes 2005 by Aryn Baker, TIMEasia, October 3, 2005
 SourceWatch: International Crisis Group

Organizations established in 1995
International organisations based in Belgium
Peace organisations based in Belgium
1995 establishments in Belgium